The following is a comparison of project management software.

General information

Features

Monetary features

See also
 Kanban (development)
 Project management software
 Project planning
 Comparison of scrum software
 Comparison of development estimation software
 Comparison of source-code-hosting facilities
 Comparison of CRM systems

Notes

References

 
Project management software